Kannauj Perfume, also known as Kannauj Ittar, is a traditional Indian perfume manufacture. The perfume production is popular in Kannauj, in the Uttar Pradesh state, India. 

It has been protected under the Geographical indication (GI) of the Agreement on Trade-Related Aspects of Intellectual Property Rights (TRIPS) agreement. It is listed at item 157 as "Kannauj Perfume" of the GI Act 1999 of the Government of India with registration confirmed by the Controller General of Patents Designs and Trademarks.

Kannauj perfume has a long historical background and Kannauj had perfume trading for thousands of years. Due to the key role of perfume production in Kannauj, the city is known as "the perfume capital of India" and "Kannauj is to India what Grasse is to France". An expert in the region says, "Kannauj has been the perfumery town of the country for thousands of years".

The perfume manufacturing skill passed through generation to generation. When a craftsman explains about their family involvement in this industry, he says "My family has been working in this field since three centuries and my son is the 30th generation". 

They make from flowers and natural resources. Also musk, camphor, saffron and other aromatic substances are used for production. Flower like white jasmine and plant like vetiver use for summer varieties while soil uses for monsoon variety, known as Mitti attar which is a specialty know for replicating petrichor, the loamy smell of a first rain. Heena attar and musk attar are winter varieties. 

The natural perfume is free of alcohol and chemical, except for some productions. Fragrant attar from rose has more smell while attar that made from sandalwood oil has lasting smell. Normally for production a small bottle of scent, it needs about 15 days.

Kannauj perfume has local and international markets and about 20 companies export to foreign countries such as UK, USA, Australia, UAE, Saudi Arabia, Iran, Iraq, Singapore, France, Oman, Qatar, etc.

See also 
 List of Geographical Indications in India
 Ittar

References 

Bibliography

External links 
 
 
History of Kannauj Attar Perfumes 
 Making Perfume From the Rain
 Land acquired for Kannauj perfume park

Geographical indications in Uttar Pradesh
Kannauj
Indian culture
Perfumes